Guillermo Vilas was the defending champion, but did not participate this year.

Manuel Orantes won the title, defeating Karl Meiler 6–1, 6–4, 6–1 in the final.

Draw

Finals

Section 1

Section 2

External links
 1976 Bavarian Tennis Championships Singles draw

Singles